Foden's Band (originally Foden's Motor Works Band, and variants with sponsors' names) is a brass band from Sandbach in Cheshire. The band derives its name from the Foden manufacturer of trucks in Sandbach. Foden's Band are one of the top brass bands in the world; regularly appearing at the top of the "World of Brass – World Rankings" In 2012, Foden's became double winners of both the National Championships and the British Open.

History

Origins
The origins of the band go back to 1900 when the village of Elworth near Sandbach in Cheshire formed its own band having been let down in its attempt to secure the services of the nearby town band to feature in the celebrations marking the relief of Mafeking in the Boer War. After a couple of years the village band was wound up, but from that base local industrialist Edwin Foden formed the Fodens Motor Works Band. For a few years the new band had modest ambitions, but in 1908 a fundamental reorganisation took place and, by the following year, it had achieved Championship Section status, a prestigious position that has been maintained ever since.

Fred and Harry Mortimer years
Conductor Fred Mortimer (1880–1953) led Fodens for 27 years from around 1927 until his death in 1953. During that time they won the national championships eight times, and according to Mortimer, had been broadcast around 250 times.

On 9 November 1933, the band appeared in the Lord Mayor's Show in London, billed as the Band of Foden Motor Works.

In 1955, the musical director, Harry Mortimer (1902–1992), formed the Men O'Brass, whereby selected members of the band combined with other players from the Fairey Band and Morris Motors Band. In January 1983, the band was sponsored by Overseas Technical Services Ltd. from Harrow, being renamed the Foden OTS Band.

In July 1986, it was sponsored by the Britannia Building Society to become the Britannia Building Society Foden Band, which became the Britannia Building Society Band. In September 1997, the band was sponsored by the Antoine Courtois company of France, to become the Fodens Courtois Band. In November 2004, the band was sponsored by Richardson Developments of Oldbury. Since 2008 the band has been without sponsorship and is currently known as the Foden's Band.

Honours
The band has been ordered to play by Royal Command on three occasions: in 1913 for George V and Queen Mary, in 1938 at Windsor Castle for George VI and Queen Elizabeth, and most recently in 1983 where the band had the honour of playing for Elizabeth II at Buckingham Palace.

The band has won the National Brass Band Championships of Great Britain twelve times. In 2008 the band won the 156th British Open Championships. It was the 11th time that the Foden's Band had triumphed at the contest. 2009 has seen further success for the band with a record breaking 4th consecutive triumph at the North West Regionals, victory at the Cambridge International Masters and then winning the Brass in Concert Championships at the Sage Centre in Gateshead in November. Recent contest highlights in 2010 have included 6th at the English Nationals, 4th at the British Open, 9th at the National Championships and most recently 3rd at Brass in Concert.

Desert Island Discs
Foden's band have been featured on the BBC's radio programme, Desert Island Discs, on several occasions:

1 Aug 1951, Jimmy Edwards (Comedy actor, Scriptwriter), The Fodens Motor Works Band: The Three Bears Suite
11 Jul 1960, Eddie Calvert (Trumpeter), Fodens Motor Works Band: Zelda (Caprice)
16 Apr 1962, Billy Butlin (Holiday camp owner), The Fodens Motor Works Band: The March of the Herald
8 Feb 1965, Owen Brannigan (Opera singer), Alec Mortimer & Foden's Motor Works Band: Drinking
16 Jan 1971, Robert Bolt (Playwright), Fairey & Fodens Massed Bands: The Stars and Stripes Forever

Contesting honours 
British Open Brass Band Championships – 12 Wins: 2012, 2008, 2004, 1964, 1928, 1927, 1926, 1915, 1913, 1912, 1910, 1909
National Championships of Great Britain – 16 wins: 2022, 2021, 2018, 2012, 1999, 1958, 1953, 1950, 1938, 1937, 1936, 1934, 1933, 1932, 1930, 1910 (barred 1935).
(Previously called the Crystal Palace 1000 Guinea Trophy)
North West Regional Championships – 16 wins, including: 2009, 2008, 2007, 2006, 2003, 2002, 2000, 1999, 1998, 1989, 1988
Brass in Concert Championships – 6 Wins: 2009, 2000, 1998, 1990, 1988, 1987.
All England Masters – 7 Wins: 2009, 2007, 2002, 1995, 1994, 1991, 1990.
English National Championships – Winners 2006
European Championships – Winners 1992

Musical directors 
The band's current conducting team is:
Bramwell Tovey
Michael Fowles (Associate Conductor)

Bibliography
F. D. Burgess, By royal command: the story of Fodens Motor Works Band, Publisher Webberley, 1977
Allan Littlemore, Fodens Band: One Hundred Years of Musical Excellence, Edition 2, Publisher Caron Pubns, 2000. . 186 pages.

References

External links 
 Foden's Band official website

Video clips 
 Armagh 2008 playing title music from The Children of Sanchez film.

Musical groups established in 1902
British brass bands
Culture in Cheshire
People from Sandbach